The Pacific Union is a proposed development of the Pacific Islands Forum, first suggested in 2003 by a committee of the Australian Senate, into a political and economic intergovernmental community. The union, if formed, would have a common charter, institutions and currency. Although John Howard, the former Prime Minister of Australia, spoke of a Pacific Union whilst in office, his government's emphasis was focused on bilateral relations and agreements with the individual states of the Forum.

Existing integration
The most prominent example of pre-existing regionalism amongst countries of the Pacific Ocean is the Pacific Islands Forum, an intergovernmental organisation that aims to represent the interests of its members and enhance cooperation between them. The Pacific Islands Forum does not have a common charter, institutions or currency.

Closer Economic Relations (CER) free trade agreement between the governments of New Zealand and Australia allow the free trade of most goods and services between the two nations without the tariff barriers or export incentives. The Melanesian Spearhead Group is a more recent trade treaty governing the four Melanesian states of Vanuatu, Papua New Guinea, the Solomon Islands and recently, Fiji. The nations of Australia, Nauru, Kiribati and Tuvalu use the Australian dollar while the Cook Islands, Niue, Tokelau, and New Zealand use the New Zealand Dollar.

In October 2000, national leaders of the Pacific Islands Forum signed the Biketawa Declaration constituting a framework for coordinating response to regional crises leading to New Zealand and Australian military and police forces participating in regional peacekeeping/stabilisation operations in Papua New Guinea (in Bougainville), Solomon Islands (2003–present), Nauru (2004–present) and Tonga (2006).

Future prospects 

There has been a call from within both the Australian and New Zealand business communities to extend the Closer Economic Relations (CER) Free Trade Agreement to other Pacific Island nations, moving towards a single market and allowing the free movement of people and goods. Harmonising both the CER and the Pacific Regional Trade Agreement (PARTA) is one possibility of moving towards this goal. The idea's future has become somewhat confused with the Rudd Government's call for an Asia-Pacific Community, which would have a wider membership than a Pacific Union.

See also
CANZUK
Caribbean Community and Common Market
Continental union
African Union
Central Asian Union
ASEAN
Commonwealth of Independent States (CIS)
Eurasian Economic Union
European Union
Latin American Integration Association (ALADI)
North American Union
North American Free Trade Agreement
Central American Integration System
Union of South American Nations
Mercosur

References

External links 
 Pacific Islands Forum Secretariat
 The Pacific Plan

Articles, editorials and reports
 Engaging our neighbours: Towards a new relationship between Australian and the Pacific Islands
 
 Regionalism in the Pacific: A New Development Strategy
 The Age (2003-08-13): Call for EU-Style 'Pacific Community'
 ABC (2003-08-18): Australia Floats 'Pacific Union' Idea
 The Age (2003-08-30): Time to Look at a Pacific Community
 The Age (2004-03-06): Bold Plan for Pacific Unity
 The Age (2004-04-06): Pacific Forum Beckons EU-Style Links
 ABC (2004-04-06): Pacific Plan Expected to Fall Short of Total Union
 The Age (2004-04-07): Pacific Heads Back Region Unity Plan
 Pacific Economic Bulletin (2005 #3): Towards a Pacific Community
 The Age (2005-10-09): Pacific Plan Puts Howard to the Test
 ABC (2006-07-23): Urwin Calls for Pacific Settlement

Proposed international organizations
Continental unions
Supranational unions
Australia–New Zealand relations